Sint is a 2010 Dutch horror film. Sint may also refer to:

The Saint (1997 film), a 1997 Simon Templar film
Sint., taxonomic author abbreviation of Paul Sintenis

See also
The Saint (disambiguation)